Philippe Thurey (died in Lyon 28 November 1415) was an archbishop of Lyon.

The nephew William II de Thurey, himself archbishop of Lyon, Philippe was born in Narbonne to 1335 Girard Thurey and Jeanne de la Palud and was the brother of Peter Thurey, Bishop of Maillezais, and a man named Renaud, Dean of the Chapter Saint John.  He began his religious career as canon-count chapter of St. John's Cathedral in 1364, was made cantor of the chapter in 1372, and combined the same year with the title of Marshal of Fourvière. In 1376 he also became a canon of the chapter of Saint-Just.

Elected Archbishop of Lyon in 1389, he immediately continues the fight of his predecessors against the influence of the king's officers and their justice in the city. In particular, he protests against their presence in the city, in the House of Roanne.

Expulsion of the king's officers
Letters patent of 3 April 1393  authorized him to have search of the city for the king's officers and Philippe de Thurey had put these letters in execution by a man named Givry. The latter, preceded by several clergymen carrying lanterns, went to Roanne hotel and expelled the Seneschal. He removed the king's court, and arranged for a man named Cartula to ride backwards on a donkey along the city's streets, shouting "everything is won, we have no king!". The Parliament of Paris, by judgment of 5 October 1394, counteracted the letters patent of 5 April 1393 and punished Givry and Catula, and ordered the archbishop to pay damages to the king's officers, who were immediately restored. Despite this decision, Philippe Thurey disturbed more than once the royal officers in the exercise of their duties.

Latter Life
 He had been successful in 1393, with popular support. However,  the arrival of Amédée II de Talaru nephew of his predecessor changed that. His right to coin money was abolished, but he managed to maintain primacy of the Church of Lyons over Rouen and Paris.

In 1409, he attended the Council of Pisa. In 1415, Philippe de Thurey appointed as abbot of Savigny one of his own nephews, the monks who refused to accept the appointment were excommunicated. He financially supports the completion of the roof of the Cathedral of St. John and directs interior renovations in the St. Stephen Church inb Lyon.

At his death, he was probably buried in Holy Sepulchre Chapel of the Cathedral lyonnaise.

His Coat of Arms were: Gules of a gold necklace. The shield placed on the episcopal cross, which in some cases charging the shield.

References

Year of birth unknown
1415 deaths
Archbishops of Lyon